WCW/nWo Thunder is a professional wrestling video game based on the professional wrestling television show of the same name and released on the PlayStation console by THQ in January 1999. Thunder is the sequel to WCW Nitro and updates the previous game with new characters and features, including cage matches, battle royals, weapon use, and the ability to select what stable each wrestler competed for (this included WCW, nWo Hollywood, nWo Wolfpac, Raven's Flock, and The Four Horsemen). However, Thunder received poor reviews. Many of these were due to its graphics, style, and overall atmosphere, which bore too many similarities to WCW Nitro, along with concerns the game was too easy.

Later in 1999 and 2000, new versions of the game's predecessor Nitro were released for Nintendo 64 and Microsoft Windows, featuring the updated roster from Thunder.

Reception

Next Generation reviewed the PlayStation version of the game, rating it three stars out of five, and stated that "While the improvements made in Thunder aren't terribly significant, they do make it a worthy upgrade from Nitro - but they don't put Thunder at the top of the wrestling pile just yet. It's good, but WWF Warzone is still number one."

WCW/nWo Thunder received "mixed" reviews according to the review aggregation website GameRankings.  Most very mixed points were given to the poor graphics, and difficulty of the controls.  Despite the mediocre reviews given, the game went on to sell 1 million copies.

See also

List of licensed wrestling video games

References

External links

1999 video games
World Championship Wrestling video games
PlayStation (console)-only games
Multiplayer and single-player video games
PlayStation (console) games
Professional wrestling games
THQ games
Video games developed in the United States